AdAway is a free and open-source ad-blocking application for the Android mobile operating system.

History 

It was started in June 2011 by Dominik Schürmann but is now maintained by other developers. In 2013, it was removed from the Google Play store along with other ad blocking apps. After its removal, AdAway used the app store F-Droid to serve downloads.

Features 

AdAway blocks ads using hosts files from various locations and combines them automatically. The user is able to whitelist or blacklist additional domains, or add a new hosts file altogether. There is an option to log DNS requests to help whitelisting or blacklisting. AdAway requires in the actual version 5.10.0 either root access (because the hosts file is in the system partition) or the use of DNS, which is provided by AdAway itself.

References

External links 
 
 

Advertising-free media
Free and open-source Android software
Online advertising
Ad blocking software